The 2018–19 Curling World Cup was the first edition of the Curling World Cup, held between men's, women's, and mixed doubles teams. It had three legs and a Grand Final, taking place in Suzhou, China, Omaha, United States, Jönköping, Sweden, and Beijing, China respectively.

Format

Curling World Cup matches have eight ends, rather than the standard ten ends. Ties after eight ends are decided by a shoot-out, with each team throwing a stone and the one closest to the button winning. A win in eight or fewer ends earns a team 3 points, a shoot-out win 2 points, a shoot-out loss 1 point, and 0 points for a loss in eight or fewer ends.

Each event has eight teams in the men's, women's, and mixed doubles tournament. The teams are split into two groups of four, based on the Curling World Cup rankings, whereby the 1st, 3rd, 5th, and 7th, ranked teams are in one group and the 2nd, 4th, 6th, and 8th ranked teams in the other. The first place teams in each group plays against each other in the final. In the event of a tie for first place, a shoot-out is used, with the same format used to decide matches tied after eight ends.

Qualification

For the first three legs of the Curling World Cup, the eight spots in the tournament are allocated to each of the hosting member associations, the highest ranked member association in each zone (the Americas, European, and Pacific-Asia), and two teams chosen by the World Curling Federation. Member associations may choose to send the same teams to all three legs or have different teams.

The following countries qualified for each discipline:

The host (China), the winners of each leg, the current world champions, a team specifically invited, and the two highest remaining member associations on the Curling World Cup ranking list qualified for the Grand Final. Two separate teams from the same member association may qualify for the Grand Final.

The following countries qualified for each discipline:

Notes
  Team Homan is being replaced by a team consisting of Jennifer Jones, Kaitlyn Lawes, Shannon Birchard and Jill Officer due to Homan and her second Joanne Courtney being due to give birth in the summer.
  The 2018 World Mixed Doubles Curling Champions, Michèle Jäggi and Sven Michel, were selected to compete due to the short time between the 2019 Championship and the Grand Final.
  With Team Edin already qualified for the Grand Final, Switzerland, the highest-ranked country not yet qualified, was invited.
  In each discipline, the WCF chose to invite the highest-ranked country not yet qualified.

Ranking points
Ranking points were assigned in each of the first three legs to determine the final member associations qualified for the Grand Final. Member associations were awarded their points from round robin play as well as 5 points for the runner-up and 10 for the champion.

Women

Men

Mixed doubles

First Leg

Women

Round-robin standings

Final
Sunday, September 17, 12:00

Men

Round-robin standings

Final
Sunday, September 17, 16:00

Mixed doubles

Round-robin standings

Final
Sunday, September 16, 08:30

Second Leg

Women

Round-robin standings

Final
Sunday, December 9, 12:00

Men

Round-robin standings

Final
Sunday, December 9, 16:00

Mixed doubles

Round-robin standings

Final
Sunday, December 9, 08:30

Third Leg

Women

Round-robin standings

Final
Sunday, February 3, 16:00

Men

Round-robin standings

Final
Sunday, February 3, 12:00

Mixed doubles

Round-robin standings

Final
Sunday, February 3, 08:30

Grand Final

Women

Round-robin standings

Final
Sunday, May 12, 16:00

Men

Round-robin standings

Final
Sunday, May 12, 09:00

Mixed doubles

Round-robin standings

Final
Sunday, May 12, 13:00

References

Curling World Cup
Curling World Cup 2018-2019
Curling World Cup 2018-2019